Eduard Köck (26 February 1880 – 3 November 1961) was an Austrian stage and film actor. He made a few silent film appearances, but most of his screen performances were character roles during the 1940s and 1950s.

Selected filmography
 The Prodigal Son (1934)
 Militiaman Bruggler (1936)
 Frau Sixta (1938)
 A Mother's Love (1939)
 I Am Sebastian Ott (1939)
 The Vulture Wally (1940)
 Vienna 1910 (1943)
 Kohlhiesel's Daughters (1943)
 Earth (1947)
 Ulli and Marei (1948)
 Cordula (1950)
 Veronika the Maid (1951)
 The Last Reserves (1953)
 Dark Clouds Over the Dachstein (1953)
 The Cornet (1955)
 The Song of Kaprun (1955)

References

Bibliography
 Fritsche, Maria. Homemade Men in Postwar Austrian Cinema: Nationhood, Genre and Masculinity. Berghahn Books, 2013.

External links

1880 births
1961 deaths
Austrian male film actors
Austrian male stage actors
Actors from Innsbruck